Ruth Miriam Hollick (17 March 1883 – 7 April 1977) was an Australian portrait and fashion photographer who was one of Melbourne's leading Pictorialist photographers during the 1920s.

Education and personal life
Ruth Miriam Hollick was born in the Williamstown area of Melbourne, Australia, in 1883, the last of 13 children of Harry Ebenezer Hollick, a civil servant, and  Frances Jane (Cole) Hollick. She was raised in the suburb of Moonee Ponds and educated at the National Gallery of Victoria Art School (1902–06), where one of her teachers was the painter Frederick McCubbin, but she received no formal training in photography.

Her professional partner, Dorothy Izard, was also her life partner.

In 1950 Hollick and Izard embarked on their first overseas travel, visiting relatives and touring the UK. On their return they moved to Heidelberg.

Photography career
There is evidence that Hollick was experimenting with photography in a home darkroom by 1907. The following year, she set herself up as a freelance photographer who toured rural areas of the state of Victoria, making portraits of families, especially children. She worked mostly outdoors in natural light with a field camera.

By World War I, she had shifted into studio photography, initially working out of her parents' house in Moonee Ponds and later moving into Mina Moore's former studio in the Auditorium Building downtown, subsequently expanding still further into Chartres House. It was in this period that Hollick developed a reputation for skillful use of both natural and studio lighting and for stylish compositions, often setting her subjects against plain backgrounds. She specialized in portraits of society figures and celebrities, as well as fashion photography for use in advertisements. For example, she took several pictures of the British aviator Amy Johnson on her 1930 world tour, including the official Australian portrait.

For most of the 1920s, Hollick was one of Melbourne's two leading photographers, along with Pegg Clarke, and she  exhibited her work both locally and internationally. During this period she won at least six silver awards and numerous bronze awards in various shows. Her photographs were regularly published in Art in Australia and other Australian magazines. In recent years, her work has been included in at least two large-scale exhibitions of Australian photography.

Hollick gave up her downtown studios during the Great Depression and returned to working from Moonee Ponds. She retired from photography in 1950 and died in 1977 at Sandringham.

Selected exhibitions
The Paris End: Photography, Fashion & Glamour (2007; National Gallery of Victoria touring exhibition)
Masterpieces of Australian Photography (1989)
Amateur Photographer Overseas Exhibition, London (1932)
Melbourne Exhibition of Pictorial Photography (1929: only woman in show)
Chicago Photographic Exhibition (1927)
Colonial Exhibitions of the Royal Photographic Society of Great Britain (1925, 1927)
London Salon of Photography (1920)

Collections
Hollick's glass plate negatives and original prints are held in collections of the following institutions:
 Ruth Hollick Collection, State Library of Victoria (digitised image collection)
 National Gallery of Australia
 Art Gallery of New South Wales

References

Further reading
Van Wyk, Susan. The Paris End: Photography, Fashion & Glamour (National Gallery Of Victoria, 2009) — includes Hollick's work
Tsara, Olga. Ruth Hollick and early Australian fashion photography (State Library of Victoria)

1883 births
1977 deaths
Australian women photographers
Artists from Melbourne
Australian LGBT photographers
People from Moonee Ponds, Victoria
National Gallery of Victoria Art School alumni